Wiaderno  is a village in the administrative district of Gmina Tomaszów Mazowiecki, within Tomaszów Mazowiecki County, Łódź Voivodeship, in central Poland.

References

Wiaderno